The Professional Touch is a 1976 Australian TV movie directed by Oscar Whitbread starring Cul Cullen.

References

External links

1976 films
Australian television films